The President's Strategic and Policy Forum was a business forum created by the U.S. President Donald Trump to give the president perspectives from business leaders on how to create jobs and improve growth for the U.S. economy. It consisted of 16 members chaired by Stephen A. Schwarzman, the co-founder of private equity firm The Blackstone Group, and started holding gatherings in February 2017.

Following the withdrawal of several members, on August 16, 2017, Trump disbanded the Strategic and Policy Forum as well as the American Manufacturing Council.

Members
Former members of the forum:

 Paul S. Atkins – CEO of Patomak Global Partners and former commissioner of the SEC
 Mary Barra – chairwoman and CEO of General Motors
 Toby Cosgrove – president and CEO of the Cleveland Clinic
 Kenneth C. Griffin – chairman, president, and CEO of Citadel LLC
 Jamie Dimon* – chairman, president, and CEO of JPMorgan Chase
 Larry Fink – chairman and CEO of BlackRock
 Kenneth Frazier* – chairman and CEO of Merck & Co.
 Bob Iger* – chairman and CEO of The Walt Disney Company
 Travis Kalanick* – chairman and CEO of Uber
 Brian Krzanich* – CEO of Intel
 Rich Lesser – president and CEO of the Boston Consulting Group
 Doug McMillon – president and CEO of Walmart Stores
 Jim McNerney – former president and CEO of Boeing
 Elon Musk* – president and CEO of Tesla Motors and SpaceX
 Indra Nooyi – chairwoman and CEO of PepsiCo
 Adebayo Ogunlesi – chairman and managing partner at Global Infrastructure Partners
 Kevin Plank* – chairman and CEO of Under Armour
 Ginni Rometty – chairwoman, president, and CEO of IBM
 Stephen Schwarzman* – co-founder, chairman, and CEO of The Blackstone Group
 Kevin Warsh – distinguished visiting fellow in economics at the Hoover Institute and former governor of the Federal Reserve
 Mark Weinberger – chairman and CEO of EY
 Jack Welch – former chairman and CEO of General Electric
 Daniel Yergin – Pulitzer Prize-winning author and vice chairman of IHS Markit
* Resigned prior to dissolution.

Resignations and disbandment
Prior to its dissolution, a number of members had resigned, including Elon Musk (protesting against the US withdrawal from the Paris Climate agreement), Travis Kalanick, Bob Iger, Ken Frazier, Brian Krzanich, Kevin Plank, Stephen Schwarzman and Jamie Dimon. Most of the resignations were in protest of President Trump's statements regarding the 2017 Unite the Right rally in Charlottesville, Virginia.

On August 16, 2017, following five members' resignations, President Trump announced via Twitter he was disbanding the forum.

See also
 American Manufacturing Council (January–August 2017) – a similar board also disbanded

References

Presidency of the United States
Trump administration controversies
American advisory organizations
2017 establishments in Washington, D.C.
2017 disestablishments in Washington, D.C.
Defunct organizations based in Washington, D.C.